Chakwal—Khushab Road also known locally as Kalar Kahar Road is a provincially maintained road in Punjab that extends from Chakwal to Khushab.

Features
Length: 101 km
Lanes: 4 lane
Speed limit: Universal minimum speed limit of 80 km/h and a maximum speed limit of 100 km/h for heavy transport vehicles and 120 km/h for light transport vehicles.

References

Roads in Punjab, Pakistan
Chakwal District